Herbisse is a commune in the Aube department in north-central France.

Geography

Herbisse is a small village in the Champagne crayeuse located on a stream call l'Herbissonne. Most of the village's land is used for agriculture.

Population

Monuments
 The Roman Catholic Church dedicated to the Virgin Mary
 The Memorial dedicated to the soldiers from the village who dies in World War I and World War II.
 the Tombstones of 7 Royal Air Force airmen (5 of the Royal Air Force Voluntary Reserve and 2 from the Royal New Zealand Air Force) of the 49 Squadron Bomber Command. They died on 19 July 1944 when their Lancaster Mk III (Number JB178) crashed. The crew was on its 27th mission.

See also
 Communes of the Aube department

References

Communes of Aube